Mount Aeolus may refer to:

 Mount Aeolus (Alberta)
 Mount Aeolus (Antarctica)
 Mount Aeolus (Vermont)